"Long Goodbye" is a song by the British pop group Thompson Twins, released in 1987 as the second and final single from their sixth studio album Close to the Bone. It was written by Alannah Currie and Tom Bailey, and produced by Rupert Hine and Bailey. "Long Goodbye" peaked at No. 89 in the UK.

A music video was filmed to promote the single. It was directed by Meiert Avis and produced by Paul Spencer for Midnight Films. In the US, it received medium rotation on MTV and play on The Record Guide network.

Writing
"Long Goodbye" was inspired by the grief suffered by Currie and Bailey when they lost their baby to a miscarriage and the death of Currie's mother on the same day. After several months of grieving, the pair began writing new material for the next Thompson Twins album, Close to the Bone. Following the release of the lead single "Get That Love", the duo's label Arista selected "Long Goodbye" as the follow-up.

Currie told The Chicago Tribune in 1987: "I can't hear it without crying. I'll turn the radio off when it comes on. I skip that song on the album. It's weird to me that they're releasing it as a single, because for me it's a grieving song. I spent all of last summer crying. It was an awful time, and I put a lot of my feelings into that song. It was like a parting gift - I believe that people continue on spiritually after they die - and it was nice to write a tribute to my mother, who was so wonderful. But it was sad, and it was impossible to separate my feelings about my mother's death and the miscarriage. "Long Goodbye" is all of those things condensed into something quite subtle and quite painful. It's all okay now, I'm okay, and I'm looking forward to having children in the future. But... I still can't bear to listen to that song."

Critical reception
On its release, Ian Cranna of Smash Hits described the song as "slow [and] reflective". He questioned the decision to release the song as a single but added, "Nevertheless, it's still their best for ages - a gentle, wistful piano song that recalls 'Sister of Mercy' with an appropriately anguished middle bit. And for once they show their true colours as sympathetic real people instead of something out of an advert - fingers crossed for a hit." Roger Morton of Record Mirror felt the duo "sound far too sorry for themselves to be hungry with this slow fade to piano blues". He added, "Might have been a half-decent song if it hadn't reminded me so much of early Police."

In the United States, Billboard commented, "Preferred selection from Close to the Bone is a poignant midtempo ballad that receives the band's customary ornate and lavish treatment". Jacob N. Lunders of AllMusic called the song "reflective". In a review of the band's 1987 Park West Stage concert, The Deseret News commented: ""Long Goodbye" is a moving, almost eerie-sounding ballad on the album. But played live, it didn't pack much emotional power, despite Currie dedicating it to her mother and child, who both died last year."

Formats
7" single
"Long Goodbye" – 3:32
"Dancing In Your Shoes" – 4:28

12" single
"Long Goodbye" (Extended Mix) – 7:56
"Long Goodbye" (7" Version) – 3:32
"Dancing In Your Shoes" (7" Version) – 4:28

CD single
"Long Goodbye" (Extended Mix) – 7:56
"Dancing In Your Shoes" (7" Version) – 4:28
"Hold Me Now" (12" Version) – 9:54

CD single (promo)
"Long Goodbye" (7" Version) – 3:47
"Long Goodbye" (Extended Mix) – 4:56♦
♦Exclusive mix found only on the promo.

Personnel
Thompson Twins
 Tom Bailey – vocals, guitar, keyboards
 Alannah Currie – percussion

Production
 Rupert Hine, Tom Bailey – producers
 Stephen W. Tayler – engineer
 Andrew Scarth, Robin Goodfellow – assistant engineers

Other
 Alannah Currie – artwork direction
 Andie Airfix, Satori – artwork design
 Carrie Branovan – photography

Charts

Official versions

References

1987 singles
Thompson Twins songs
Songs written by Alannah Currie
Songs written by Tom Bailey (musician)
1987 songs
Song recordings produced by Rupert Hine
Arista Records singles
Music videos directed by Meiert Avis
Commemoration songs
Song recordings produced by Tom Bailey (musician)